Saint-Pourçain may refer to several communes in France:
 Saint-Pourçain-sur-Sioule, in the Allier department
 Saint-Pourçain-sur-Besbre, in the Allier department

It may also refer to an Appellation d'origine contrôlée for wine:
 Saint-Pourçain AOC
and to an Appellation d'origine protégée for cheese.